A Little Princess is a children's novel by Frances Hodgson Burnett, first published as a book in 1905. It is an expanded version of the short story "Sara Crewe: or, What Happened at Miss Minchin's", which was serialized in St. Nicholas Magazine from December 1887, and published in book form in 1888. According to Burnett, after she composed the 1902 play A Little Un-fairy Princess based on that story, her publisher asked that she expand the story as a novel with "the things and people that had been left out before". The novel was published by Charles Scribner's Sons (also publisher of St. Nicholas) with illustrations by Ethel Franklin Betts and the full title A Little Princess: Being the Whole Story of Sara Crewe Now Being Told for the First Time.

Plot

Captain Ralph Crewe, a wealthy English widower, has been raising his only child, Sara, in India where he is stationed with the British Army. Because the Indian climate is considered too harsh for their children, British families living there traditionally send their children to boarding school back home in England. The Captain enrolls his seven-year-old daughter at Miss Minchin's boarding school for girls in London and dotes on his daughter so much that he orders and pays the headmistress for special treatment and exceptional luxuries for Sara, such as a private room for her with a personal maid and a separate sitting room (see Parlour boarder), along with Sara's own private carriage and a pony. Miss Minchin openly fawns over Sara for her money, but is secretly bitter toward her for her wealth.

In spite of said wealth, Sara is not self-centered, rude, disobedient, or snobbish, but kind, generous, and compassionate. She extends her friendship to Ermengarde St. John, the school dunce; to Lottie, a four-year-old pupil given to tantrums; and to Becky, the lowly, stunted scullery maid. When Sara acquires the epithet "princess", she embraces its favorable elements in her natural kindheartedness.

After some time, Sara's eleventh birthday is celebrated at Miss Minchin's with a lavish party, attended by all her friends and classmates. Just as it ends, Miss Minchin learns of Captain Crewe's unfortunate demise due to jungle fever. Furthermore, prior to his death, the previously wealthy captain had lost his entire fortune; a close friend from his schoolboy days had persuaded him to cash in his investments and deposit the proceeds to develop a network of diamond mines. The scheme fails, and the preteen Sara is left an orphan and a pauper, with no other family and nowhere to go. Miss Minchin is left with a sizable unpaid bill for Sara's school fees and luxuries, including her birthday party. Infuriated and pitiless, she takes away all of Sara's possessions (except for some old frocks and her doll, Emily), makes her live in a cold and poorly furnished attic, and forces her to earn her keep by working as a servant. She also forces Sara to wear frocks much too short for her, with her thin legs peeking out of the brief skirts.

For the next two years, Sara is abused by Miss Minchin and the other servants, while Becky is very nice to her. Miss Minchin's kind younger sister, Amelia, deplores the way that Sara is treated, but is too weak-willed to speak up about it. Sara is starved, worked for long hours, sent out in all kinds of weather, poorly dressed in outgrown and worn-out clothes, and deprived of warmth or a comfortable bed in the attic. Despite her hardships, Sara is consoled by her friends and uses her imagination to cope, pretending she is a prisoner in the Bastille or a princess disguised as a servant. Sara also continues to be kind to everyone, including those who find her annoying or mistreat her. One day, she finds a coin in the street and uses it to buy buns at a bakery; despite being very hungry, she gives most of the buns away to a beggar girl who is hungrier than herself. The bakery shop owner sees this and wants to reward Sara, but she has disappeared, so the shop owner instead gives the beggar girl bread and warm shelter for Sara's sake.

[[File:Sara Crewe; or, What happened at Miss Minchin's (1888) (14595068677).jpg|thumb|left|"He was waiting for his master to come out to the carriage, and Sara stopped and spoke a few words to him": Illustration from Sara Crewe; or, What Happened at Miss Minchin's (1888)]]
Meanwhile, Mr. Carrisford and his Indian assistant, Ram Dass, have moved into the house next door to Miss Minchin's school. Carrisford had been Captain Crewe's friend and partner in the diamond mines. After the diamond mine venture failed, both Crewe and Carrisford became very ill, and Carrisford in his delirium abandoned his good childhood friend Crewe, who died of his "brain fever". As it turned out, the diamond mines did not fail, but instead were a great success, making Carrisford extremely rich. Although Carrisford survived, he suffers from several ailments and is guilt-ridden over abandoning his friend. He is determined to find Crewe's young daughter and heiress, although he does not know where she is and thinks she is attending school in France, as her late mother was a Frenchwoman.

Ram Dass befriends Sara when his pet monkey escapes into Sara's adjoining attic. After climbing over the roof to Sara's room to get the monkey, Ram Dass tells Carrisford about Sara's poor living conditions. As a pleasant distraction, Carrisford and Ram Dass buy warm blankets, comfortable furniture, food, and other gifts, and secretly leave them in Sara's room when she is asleep or out. Sara's spirits and health improve due to the gifts she receives from her mysterious benefactor, whose identity she does not know; nor are Ram Dass and Carrisford aware that Sara is Crewe's lost daughter. When Carrisford anonymously sends Sara a package of new, well-made, and expensive clothing in her proper size, Miss Minchin becomes quite alarmed, thinking Sara might have a wealthy relative secretly looking out for her, and begins to treat Sara better and allows her to attend classes rather than doing menial work.

One night, the monkey again runs away to Sara's room, and Sara visits Carrisford's house the next morning to return him. When Sara casually mentions that she was born in India, Carrisford and his solicitor question her and discover that she is Captain Crewe's daughter, for whom they have been searching for two years. Sara also learns that Carrisford was her father's childhood friend and her own anonymous benefactor and that the diamond mines have produced great riches, of which she will now own her late father's share. When Miss Minchin angrily appears to collect Sara, she is informed that Sara will be living with Carrisford from now on and her entire fortune has been restored and increased tenfold. Upon finding this out, Miss Minchin unsuccessfully tries to persuade Sara into returning to her school as a star pupil. She then threatens to keep Sara from ever seeing her school friends again, but Carrisford and his solicitor tell Miss Minchin that Sara will see anyone she wishes to see and that her friends' parents are not likely to refuse invitations from an heiress of diamond mines. Miss Minchin goes home, where she is surprised when Amelia finally stands up to her. Amelia has a breakdown afterward, but she is on the road to gaining more respect.

Sara invites Becky to live with her and be her personal maid, in much better living conditions than at Miss Minchin's. Carrisford becomes a friend and father figure to Sara and quickly regains his health. Finally, Sara—accompanied by Becky—pays a visit to the bakery where she bought the buns, making a deal with the owner to cover the bills for bread for any hungry child. They find that the beggar girl (now named Ann), who was saved from starvation by Sara's selfless act, is now the bakery owner's assistant, with good food, clothing, shelter, and steady employment.

Reception
Based on a 2007 online poll, the U.S. National Education Association listed the book as one of its "Teachers' Top 100 Books for Children". In 2012 it was ranked number 56 on a list of the top 100 children's novels published by School Library Journal.

Source material
The novella appears to have been inspired in part by Charlotte Brontë's unfinished novel Emma, the first two chapters of which were published in Cornhill Magazine in 1860, featuring a rich heiress with a mysterious past who is apparently abandoned at a boarding school.

Play

After writing Sara Crewe, Burnett returned to the material in 1902, penning the three-act stage play A Little Un-fairy Princess, which ran in London over the autumn of that year. Around the time it transferred to New York City at the start of 1903 the title was shortened to A Little Princess. It was A Little Princess in London, but The Little Princess in New York.

Burnett said that after the production of the play on Broadway, her publisher, Charles Scribner's Sons, asked her to expand the story into a full-length novel and "put into it all the things and people that had been left out before". The book was illustrated by Ethel Franklin Betts and published in 1905 under the full title A Little Princess: Being the Whole Story of Sara Crewe Now Being Told for the First Time.

Adaptations
Film

 1917 version: Mary Pickford as Sara and Katherine Griffith as Miss Minchin.
 1939 version: Shirley Temple as Sara and Mary Nash as Miss Minchin. This Technicolor adaptation notably differs from the original, in that Sara's father is wounded and missing in action in wartime, and later is reunited with his daughter with the help of Queen Victoria.  Miss Minchin's younger sister Miss Amelia is replaced with "Mr Bertie", Miss Minchin's brother, a former music hall performer, who sings and dances with Temple. A substantial portion of the story is given over to Sara's abetting of an illicit romance between an under-teacher and the school's riding master, dramatized in an elaborate fairy-tale dream sequence.
 1943 Italian version: Principessina: Rosanna Dal as Anna and Vittorina Benvenuti as the Headmistress. It is a remake of the 1939 film set in Italy, in which Sara, now renamed Anna, is the daughter of a real prince.
 Harō Kiti no shōkōjo: 1994 OVA version starring Hello Kitty produced by Sanrio.
 1995 American version: Liesel Matthews as Sara and Eleanor Bron as Miss Minchin, this adaptation notably differs from the original and more closely resembles the 1939 version, in that Sara's father is wounded and missing in action in wartime, and later is reunited with his daughter. Another difference is that it takes place in New York City during World War I instead of London during the Boer War, and the character of Becky, canonically Cockney, is recast as African-American. The film is directed by Alfonso Cuarón.
 1995 Filipino version Sarah... Ang Munting Prinsesa: Camille Prats as Sara (name changed to "Sarah"), Angelica Panganiban as Becky, and Jean Garcia as Ms. Minchin. This adaptation was mostly based on the 1985 Japanese anime series Princess Sarah, which was hugely popular with Filipino audiences during the 1990s. The film was mostly shot in Scotland, with other scenes in Baguio, Philippines.
 1996 version: An animated direct-to-video film produced by Blye Migicovsky and directed by Laura Shephard. As in the 1995 film, Sara's father is later found alive, and, like in the 1995 film, Becky is black. The voice cast includes Melissa Bathory, Lawrence Bayne, Desmond Ellis, Nonnie Griffin, Marieve Herington, Sarena Paton, Katherine Shekter, and Colette Stevenson.
 1997 Russian film A Little Princess: Anastasiya Meskova as Sara and Alla Demidova as Miss Minchin.

Television
 1973 version: Deborah Makepeace as Sara and Ruth Dunning as Miss Minchin.
 Shōkōjo Sēra: a 1978 Japanese anime adaptation featured in episodes 105-115 (eleven 10-minute segments in total) of Manga Sekai Mukashi Banashi (1976-1979), an anthology series based on fairy tales and literature classics produced by Dax International and Madhouse. This adaptation is notable for the more cruel and violent script, focusing on the abuse that Sara and Becky have to suffer from Miss Minchin and Lavinia. It also adds some new characters and events while skipping over others from the novel, such as Mr. Carmichael and his family. Sara and Becky are friends with three orphaned boys that help them in several occasions, like when Becky gets seriously ill and Miss Minchin doesn't want to call a doctor. Sara has a love interest in Frederick, the son of a wealthy supporter of the school. Sara and Becky are thrown out of the school. In the ending Sara forgives everyone and return to the school with Becky after making a large donation to it.
 Princess Sara: a 1985 Japanese anime series, which was featured as part of Nippon Animation's World Masterpiece Theater collection. The series spanned 46 episodes, including a few new characters and adventures along the way, while following pretty closely the original plot. Some of the new additions resembles the 1978 anime version: the addition of a street boy among Sara's friends, Sara's dangerous illness, her departure from the institute, her forgiveness for every mean character and her huge donation to the school. Similarly to the 1978 adaptation, this version focuses more on the saddest aspects of the story and on the bullying, although in a more mildly and less violent way. Furthermore, Sara's personality has been made significantly more obedient and kind than in the novel. Veteran Japanese voice actress Sumi Shimamoto voiced Sara Crewe.
 1986 version: Amelia Shankley as Sara and Maureen Lipman as Miss Minchin. One of the most faithful adaptations, quoting many dialogues from the book and adding only a few new scenes, including a prologue set in India.
 Sōkō no Strain, a 2006 anime that completely reworks the story into a mecha series about "Sara Werec", who finds herself robbed of the ability to pilot the titular Strain when her brother, Ralph, betrays and disgraces her family.
 Princess Sarah, a Filipino 2007 remake, loosely based on the popular 1985 anime but with fantasy elements.
 Shōkōjo Seira, a 2009 remake with the main character Japanese and named Seira, aged 16 when her father dies, and as an Indian Princess. Becky is changed to a male and a romantic lead. The 1985 TV series by Nippon Animation has a similar title in Japanese, although the two adaptations are not related.
 "The Penniless Princess" (2012), a Veggietales episode

Musicals
Due in part to the novel's public domain status, several musical versions of A Little Princess have emerged in recent years, including:
 A Little Princess, Music and Lyrics by Eric Rockwell and Margaret Rose, Book by William J. Brooke. World premiere at the Sacramento Theater Company, April 2013.
 A Little Princess, Princess Musicals – Book and Lyrics by Michael Hjort, Music by Camille Curtis.
 Sara Crewe, premiered May 2007 at Needham (Boston, MA) Community Theater, first full production November 2007 at the Blackwell Playhouse, Marietta, Georgia; music, lyrics, and book by Miriam Raiken-Kolb and Elizabeth Ellor
 Sara Crewe: A Little Princess, Wheelock Family Theatre, Boston, 2006; music and libretto by Susan Kosoff and Jane Staab
 A Little Princess, TheatreWorks, Palo Alto, California, premiered 2004; music by Andrew Lippa; book by Brian Crawley; directed by Susan H. Schulman
 A Little Princess, Wings Theatre, (Off-Broadway, New York, 2003) Book and Direction by Robert Sickinger; music and lyrics by Mel Atkey, musical director/arranger/pianist Mary Ann Ivan
 A Little Princess, Children's Musical Theater San Jose, May 2002. Book and lyrics by Tegan McLane, music by Richard Link
 A Little Princess, Bodens Youth Theatre, London, premiering February 2012; music and lyrics by Marc Folan, book by Adam Boden
 Off-Broadway U.S. Premiere, The Hudson Guild Theater, NYC, May 2014
Some of these productions have made significant changes to the book, story and characters, most notably the Sickinger/Atkey version, which moves the action to Civil War-era America.

In addition, Princesses, a 2004 musical currently in development for Broadway, features students at a boarding school presenting a production of A Little Princess. Music and book by Cheri Steinkellner and Bill Steinkellner; lyrics and direction by David Zippel.

Other theatre
 The London Children's Ballet performed ballet adaptions in 1995 (Choreographer: Harold King), 2004 (Choreographer: Vanessa Fenton) and 2012 (Choreographer: Samantha Raine).
 A theatre adaptation by John Vreeke was produced by the New York State Theatre Institute and recorded as an audio book in 1999.
 A theatre adaptation by Belt Up Theatre was performed at the Edinburgh Fringe Festival 2012 as 'Belt Up Theatre's A Little Princess'.
 An adaptation of the book, entitled Sara Crewe: The Little Princess was written by Steve Hays and was featured at CityStage in Springfield MA, performing six shows and starred Carlie Daggett in The title role.
 A theatre adaptation was written by Lauren Nichols and performed by all for One productions, inc., with original music composed by a young girl, Torilinn Cwanek, at the Allen County Public Library Auditorium in Fort Wayne, Indiana, in February 2013, performing six shows.
 Hess Oster's adaptation for youth performers (StagePlays, 2013) has been performed by STARS Drama (2013), Actor's Youth Theatre (2013), Bordentown Theatre (2014), Fruits of the Spirit Academy (2015), Mosaic Children's Theatre (2015), and Shine Performing Arts (2017).

Related books
In 1995, Apple published a series of three books written by Gabrielle Charbonnet. "The Princess Trilogy" was an updated version of the classic, with the title character named Molly, rather than Sara. Molly Stewart's father was a famous film director who left his daughter in a posh upscale boarding school. There were three books in the series, which ended in a similar way as the original: Molly's Heart, The Room on the Attic, and Home at Last.

A sequel by Hilary McKay was published by Hodder Children's Books in September 2009: Wishing For Tomorrow: The Sequel to A Little Princess. It tells the story of what happened to the rest of the boarding school girls after Sara and Becky left ("life must go on at Miss Minchin's").

Games
 A Little Lily Princess is a retelling of the classic novel in visual novel form with a Yuri Genre twist. It was released for the PC in May 2016 by the independent video game development company Hanako Games''.

References

External links

 

1905 American novels
1905 British novels
1905 children's books
American children's novels 
American novels adapted into films
American novels adapted into plays
American novels adapted into television shows
British children's novels
British novels adapted into films
British novels adapted into plays
British novels adapted into television shows
Novels about bullying
Novels about orphans
Novels by Frances Hodgson Burnett
Novels first published in serial form
Novels set in boarding schools
Novels set in British India
Novels set in London
Works originally published in St. Nicholas Magazine